The third election to the Carmarthen Rural District Council was held in March 1901. It was preceded by the 1898 election and followed by the 1904 election. The successful candidates were also elected to the Carmarthen Board of Guardians.

There were a number of unopposed returns in the rural parishes. All the contests were non-political.

Ward Results

Abergwili (two seats)

Abernant (one seat)

Conwil (two seats)

Laugharne Parish (one seat)

Laugharne Township (one seat)

Llanarthney (two seats)

Llandawke and Llansadurnen (one seat)

Llanddarog (one seat)

Llandeilo Abercowyn and Llangynog (one seat)

Llanddowror (one seat)

Llandyfaelog (one seat)

Llanfihangel Abercowin (one seat)

Llangain (one seat)

Llangunnor (one seat)

Llanllawddog (one seat)

Llanpumsaint (one seat)

Llanstephan (one seat)

Llanwinio (one seat)

Merthyr (one seat)

Mydrim (one seat)

Newchurch (one seat)

St Clears (one seat)

St Ishmaels (one seat)

Trelech a'r Betws (two seats)

Carmarthen Board of Guardians

All members of the District Council also served as members of Carmarthen Board of Guardians. In addition six members were elected to represent the borough of Carmarthen. As in 1898 all the sitting members were returned unopposed.

Carmarthen (six seats)

References

1901 Welsh local elections
December 1901 events
Elections in Carmarthenshire
20th century in Carmarthenshire